Chris Black may refer to:

Chris Black (hammer thrower) (born 1950), Scottish hammer thrower
Chris Black (screenwriter), American TV screenwriter and producer
Chris Black (footballer) (born 1982), English football (soccer) player
Chris Black (rugby union) (born 1978), Scottish rugby union player